Blowin' is the second album by the English-Irish folk rock band The Noel Redding Band, released in 1976.

Reception

In a review for allmusic, the critic William Ruhlmann suggested that "The album rocked harder than its predecessor, Clonakilty Cowboys," going on to criticise the band as "a faceless, nearly generic rock group with a rusty-voiced singer mouthing rock & roll clichés and a standard-issue guitarist."

Track listing

Personnel

The Noel Redding Band
Noel Redding – bass guitar, vocals, guitar
David Clarke – vocals, keyboards, piano
Eric Bell – guitar, vocals
Les Sampson – drums, percussion

Additional personnel
Andy Kealey – vocals
Stanley Schnier – bass guitar
Don Michael Young – keyboards, piano, organ, clavinet, Moog synthesizers

References

1976 albums
The Noel Redding Band albums
RCA Records albums